The Department of Employment and Workplace Relations (also called DEWR) was an Australian government department that existed between November 2001 and December 2007.

Scope
Information about the department's functions and/or government funding allocation could be found in the Administrative Arrangements Orders, the annual Portfolio Budget Statements, in the department's annual reports and on the Department's website.

According to the Administrative Arrangements Order (AAO) made on 26 November 2001, the department dealt with:
Employment policy, including employment services 
Job Network 
Labour market programs, including the Work for the Dole scheme
Workplace relations policy development, advocacy and implementation 
Promotion of flexible workplace relations policies and practices 
Co-ordination of labour market research 
Australian government employment workplace relations policy, including administration of the framework for agreement making and remuneration and conditions  
Occupational health and safety, rehabilitation and compensation
Equal employment opportunity 
Work and family issues

Structure
The department was an Australian Public Service department, staffed by officials who were responsible to the Minister for Employment and Workplace Relations. The Secretary of the Department was Peter Boxall.

References

Ministries established in 2001
Employment and Workplace Relations
2001 establishments in Australia
2007 disestablishments in Australia